Ashlesha Sawant (born 24 September 1984) is an Indian television actress. She played Meera in Kumkum Bhagya, Preeti Sameer Deshpande in Star Plus's soap opera Pyaar Ka Dard Hai Meetha Meetha Pyaara Pyaara, Tara in Saat Phere: Saloni Ka Safar and Barkha Kapadia in Anupamaa.

Early life
Sawant was born on 24 September 1984 in Pune; she completed her T.Y.B.Com in 2003. Her father is in the Air Force.

Personal life
Sawant is in relationship with actor Sandeep Baswana since 2004.

Career
After Standard XII, she got into local modelling for about a year. Then she started training for the Gladrags contest. During that time, Balaji's auditions were taking place in Pune. Sawant went to the auditions for a lark. They shortlisted her for Kya Hadsaa Kya Haqeeqat, and she had to move to Mumbai. The KHKH shoot did not happen, and she played a small role in Kasautii Zindagii Kay as Rishab Bajaj's associate. Ekta Kapoor informed Sawant that she was keen to cast her in Kyunki Saas Bhi Kabhi Bahu Thi (Star Plus) and Kammal (Zee TV). She accepted both offers. Sawant also played the role of Rohit Sharma's wife in Des Mein Niklla Hoga Chand. She played the role of Preeti in Pyaar Ka Dard Hai Meetha Meetha Pyaara Pyaara. She played the role of Meera, Riya Mehra's governess in Kumkum Bhagya. Since 2022, she is portraying Barkha Kapadia opposite Rohit Bakshi in Anupamaa.

Filmography

Television

 Kyunki Saas Bhi Kabhi Bahu Thi as Teesha Mehta / Teesha Gautam Virani (2002–2003)
 Kammal as Anita Bhatia / Anita Manav Jajoo (2002–2003)
 Kasautii Zindagii Kay as Rishab Bajaj's Associate (2003)
 Kya Hadsaa Kya Haqeeqat – Karzz as Sonia Amar Mehra (2003)
 Kahiin To Hoga as Mouli Sinha (2003–2004)
 Des Mein Niklla Hoga Chand as Anjali Rohit Sharma (2003–2004)
 Baal Baal Bacche as Menaka (2004-2005)
 Chi and Me as Rashmi Saxena (2005)
 Saat Phere: Saloni Ka Safar as Tara Brijesh Singh (2005–2009)
 Kaisa Ye Pyar Hai as Sheetal (2006)
 Vaidehi as Bhumija Jaisingh (2006)
 Pavitra Rishta as Urmila Ashwin Sagar (2009–2010)
 Bayttaab Dil Kee Tamanna Hai as Lekha (2009–2010)
 Dil Se Diya Vachan as Urmila Pratham Rajadhyaksha (2010–2011)
 Pyaar Ka Dard Hai Meetha Meetha Pyaara Pyaara as Preeti Diwan / Preeti Sameer Deshpande (2012–2014)
 Phir Bhi Na Maane...Badtameez Dil as Nishi Satish Sahni (2015)
 Vishkanya...Ek Anokhi Prem Kahani as Evil Spirit / Mandira (2016)
 Porus as Pritha (2017–2018)
 Mayavi Maling as Mandari (2018)
 Kumkum Bhagya as Meera (2019–2021)
 Alif Laila as Noor (2020)
 Anupamaa as Barkha Kapadia (2022-present)

Films
 Haryana as Bimla

Awards

References

External links

Living people
1984 births
Actresses from Pune
Actresses from Mumbai
Indian television actresses
Indian soap opera actresses
Indian film actresses
Actresses in Hindi television
Actresses in Hindi cinema
21st-century Indian actresses